Nancy Richey defeated Ann Jones in the final, 5–7, 6–4, 6–1 to win the women's singles tennis title at the 1968 French Open. It was her first French Open title and second (and last) major title overall, after the 1967 Australian Championships.

Françoise Dürr was the defending champion, but was defeated in the fourth round by Gail Sherriff. 

This was the first Grand Slam tournament of the Open Era, in which professionals were allowed to compete against amateurs.

Seeds

  Billie Jean King (semifinals)
  Ann Jones (final)
  Françoise Dürr (fourth round)
  Rosie Casals (fourth round)
  Nancy Richey (champion)
  Kerry Melville (fourth round)
  Vlasta Vopičková (quarterfinals)
  Maria Bueno (quarterfinals)
  Patricia Walkden (fourth round)
  Lea Pericoli (withdrew)
  Annette du Plooy (semifinals)
  Galina Baksheeva (fourth round)
  Elena Subirats (quarterfinals)
  Gail Sherriff (quarterfinals)
  Edda Buding (fourth round)
  Monique Salfati (second round)

Draw

Finals

Top half

Section 1

Section 2

Section 3

Section 4

Bottom half

Section 5

Section 6

Section 7

Section 8

References

External links

1968 French Open – Women's draws and results at the International Tennis Federation

Women's Singles
French Open by year – Women's singles
French Open
French Open
French